Favale is a frazione in the Province of Teramo in the Abruzzo region of Italy.

Notes

References

Frazioni of the Province of Teramo